Manasi Parekh is an Indian actress, singer, producer and content creator. She is known for her roles as Gulaal in Star Plus's Zindagi Ka Har Rang...Gulaal and Maya in Sumit Sambhal Lega.

Personal life
Manasi Parekh is a Gujarati born and brought up in Mumbai. Although born in Mumbai, she is culturally inclined toward Gujarat and frequently visits Gujarat. She grew up listening to music and is a fan of Purshottam Upadhyaya. She is married to musician Parthiv Gohil. They have a daughter

Career
Manasi made her debut in acting with the serial Kitni Mast Hai Zindagi in 2004 but became popular in Star One's India Calling in 2005. She won Zee TV's singing reality show Star Ya Rockstar. Manasi appeared in Star Plus' prime time show Gulaal.  She was also seen in shows like 9X's Remote Control and Star One's Laughter Ke Phatke. She appeared in the Tamil romance film Leelai alongside actor Shiv Panditt, which was released in April 2012. Manasi made her Hindi debut with Yeh Kaisi Life which premiered at the IFFI Festival in Goa. 

In 2019, she made her debut as a producer through the Gujarati webseries Do Not Disturb. In 2020, she debuted in Gujarati cinema with Golkeri.

Television

Films

Short films

Web series

Theatre

Home production

References

External links
 
 
 Mansi goes India calling "I love regional food"
 Manasi Parekh Gohil Age, Height, Husband and Facts"

Living people
Indian women playback singers
Indian television actresses
Actresses in Gujarati cinema
21st-century Indian actresses
Actresses in Tamil cinema
Actresses in Hindi television
Gujarati people
Actresses from Mumbai
People from Mumbai
Year of birth missing (living people)